Threemile Run (Three Mile Run) is a tributary of the Tohickon Creek in Bucks County, Pennsylvania in the United States and is part of the Delaware River watershed.

History
Threemile Run was named so long before it was so noted in John Scully's map of the Province of Pennsylvania in 1770. It flows in the first valley north of the East Branch Perkiomen Creek and powered several grist mills in its early days.

Statistics
Threemile Run's GNIS identification number is 1189555, its Pennsylvania Department of Conservation and Natural Resources identification number is 03168. The stream drains  and reaches its confluence at the Tohickon Creek's 17.60 river mile within the banks of Lake Nockamixon.

Course
Threemile Run rises in West Rockhill Township, Bucks County, Pennsylvania, from an unnamed pond at an elevation of  next to Catch Basin Road and flows southeast, south, then southeast and meets a tributary from the right bank, then turns right to flow northeast. Threemile drained into the Tohickon Creek before the Tohickon was dammed in 1972 to form Lake Nockamixon.

Geology
Appalachian Highlands Division
Piedmont Province
Gettysburg-Newark Lowland Section
Brunswick Formation
Diabase
The Brunswick Formation is a sedimentary layer of rock consisting of mudstone, siltstone, and beds of green, brown, and red-brown shale. Mineralogy consists of argillite and hornfels. About 200 million years ago, magma intruded into the Brunswick and cooled quickly forming a fine grained diabase consisting of primarily labradorite and augite. Haycock Mountain (on the right bank of the creek) and several other features in the area are remnants of the intrusion after the Brunswick has eroded away over time. The first mile or so of Threemile Run's course is located in a region of diabase rock which intruded into the local sedimentary layers of the Brunswick Formation during the Jurassic and the Triassic, then the remaining course flows over the Brunswick Formation.

Crossings and Bridges

References

Rivers of Bucks County, Pennsylvania
Rivers of Pennsylvania
Tributaries of Tohickon Creek